Gabriel Marian Samolej (born June 1, 1961) is a former Polish ice hockey goaltender. He played for the Poland men's national ice hockey team at the 1984 Winter Olympics in Sarajevo, the 1988 Winter Olympics in Calgary, and the 1992 Winter Olympics in Albertville.

References

1961 births
Living people
Ice hockey players at the 1984 Winter Olympics
Ice hockey players at the 1988 Winter Olympics
Ice hockey players at the 1992 Winter Olympics
Olympic ice hockey players of Poland
People from Jasło
Sportspeople from Podkarpackie Voivodeship
Polish ice hockey goaltenders
Podhale Nowy Targ players